The English Game is a British historical sports drama television miniseries developed by Julian Fellowes for Netflix about the origins of modern association football in England. The six-part series was released on 20 March 2020.

Premise
In the 1870s, football in the United Kingdom was a sport for the wealthy. A working-class star and his upper-class counterpart come together to change the game forever.

Cast

Main
 Edward Holcroft as Arthur Kinnaird
 Kevin Guthrie as Fergus Suter
 Charlotte Hope as Margaret Alma Kinnaird
 Niamh Walsh as Martha Almond
 Craig Parkinson as James Walsh
 James Harkness as Jimmy Love

Supporting
 Ben Batt as John Cartwright
 Gerard Kearns as Tommy Marshall
 Henry Lloyd-Hughes as Alfred Lyttelton
 Kerrie Hayes as Doris Platt
 Joncie Elmore as Ted Stokes
 Mary Higgins as Ada Hornby
 Sam Keeley as Smalley
 Harry Michell as Monkey Hornby
 Philip Hill-Pearson as Tom Hindle

Recurring
 Daniel Ings as Francis Marindin
 Kate Phillips as Laura Lyttelton
 Kelly Price as Lydia Cartwright
 Anthony Andrews as Lord Kinnaird
 Sylvestra Le Touzel as Lady Kinnaird
 Sammy Hayman as Davy Burns
 Lara Peake as Betsy Cronshaw
 John Askew as Jack Hunter
 Michael Nardone as Douglas Suter
 Kate Dickie as Aileen Suter

Episodes

Production
In April 2018, it was announced Downton Abbey creator Julian Fellowes would write and executive produce his first Netflix series. Birgitte Stærmose and Tim Fywell are directing, Rory Aitken, Eleanor Moran and Ben Pugh of 42 are executive producing, and Ben Vanstone is co-executive producing.

The cast was announced in May 2019 as production began in England, mostly in the North.

The epilogue reads: "In 1885 the FA changed their rules to allow professional players. An amateur team never won the FA Cup again. Arthur Kinnaird became President of the FA, serving 33 years until his death in 1923.  Fergus Suter and Jimmy Love are recognised as pioneers of the modern game, which now has over four billion fans across the world."

Historical accuracy

Football
After the first couple of episodes the exact dates of events is not explicitly mentioned, though it is suggested that the entire series takes place over just over one season, with Suter winning the cup with Blackburn the year after he joined Darwen. In fact Suter did not win the FA Cup until his sixth season in Lancashire.

At the time, Blackburn had two teams: Blackburn Olympic and Blackburn Rovers. The English Game appears to merge the two sides, with the club only ever referred to as "Blackburn Football Club" or just "Blackburn" and shown playing in maroon shirts - both Blackburn Olympic and Blackburn Rovers instead played in a combination of blue and white. The maroon colour may have been chosen to differentiate Blackburn from the Old Etonians, who are always shown wearing Eton blue shirts. Blackburn Olympic were the first club of working-class background to win the FA Cup, triumphing in the 1882–83 season. Of the two teams, Suter in fact joined Blackburn Rovers, with whom he lost the 1882 FA Cup Final 1-0 against the Old Etonians before winning the cup three times in succession later in the decade.

The matches depicted in the show most closely resemble Blackburn Olympic's 1883 victory. Old Etonians' and Blackburn Olympics' matches in the quarter-finals, semis and the final are all referenced accurately except for Old Etonians' quarter-final where they in fact played Hendon. Darwen are shown as being eliminated from the competition by Derby St Luke's but the Derby club did not actually participate in the FA Cup until the 1884–85 season, and the two sides never met in a competitive fixture.

The first episode depicts Darwen playing just one replay against the Old Etonians in the 1878–79 FA Cup and losing. In fact, Darwen took the Old Etonians to two replays – after the first match was drawn 5–5, the first replay finished 2–2 before Old Etonians finally beat them at the third attempt by a score of 6–2.

Personal
Fergus "Fergie" Suter and James "Jimmy" Love joined Darwen separately, with the former joining second in 1878 - Suter was a stonemason, not a mill worker, and would not have come to Darwen to work in a mill. Jimmy Love did not join Darwen to be a paid player, but in fact fled his home in Glasgow when a warrant was put out for his arrest over debts he owed. There is no evidence that he ever joined a Blackburn team permanently, though he did appear for Blackburn Rovers in a friendly against Darwen in 1879. His footballing career was ended in 1880, though not because of a bad tackle but instead as he was recruited into the Royal Marines. Three years later he died of enteric fever while garrisoned with them in Egypt.

A recurring storyline in the series is Arthur Kinnaird's failure to have a child and the resulting effects that it has, particularly on his wife who sees child-raising as her raison d'être. In reality, Arthur and his wife had no such problems. They had their first child in 1876, several years before the start of the show, and went on to have another six children over the following quarter of a century, most of whom survived childhood. Alma Kinnaird is shown as having a miscarriage in the second episode, which - though not specified - must have taken place in late 1879. This could not have happened as Alma in fact gave birth to the couple's second child in August of that year.

Release
A trailer was released on 5 March 2020.

Reception
On Metacritic, the series has a weighted average score of 62 out of 100, based on 4 critics, indicating "generally favorable reviews".

References

External links
 
 

2020s British drama television series
2020s British television miniseries
2020 British television series debuts
2020 British television series endings
Association football television series
Television series created by Julian Fellowes
Television series set in the 1870s
Television shows filmed in the United Kingdom
Television shows set in England
English-language Netflix original programming
Films directed by Tim Fywell
Television shows shot in Liverpool